Bob Alloo (born May 7, 1949) is an American former professional tennis player.

Alloo, originally from the Pacific coast, was a two-time Kansas AA state champion while at Shawnee Mission East High School. The family moved to Kansas in the mid-1960s when his father, a General Motors Buick manager, was transferred to Kansas City. He had an elder brother Chuck who also played tennis and was on the varsity team at Stanford.

A collegiate player for UC Berkeley, Alloo achieved All-American honors in 1969 and 1970.

Alloo featured in the singles main draw of the 1970 US Open and was beaten in the first round by ex-Berkeley player Jim McManus. He also appeared twice in the US Open men's doubles main draw.

References

External links
 
 

1949 births
Living people
American male tennis players
California Golden Bears men's tennis players